SS West Maximus was a steel-hulled freighter built for the United States Shipping Board's emergency wartime construction program during World War I. Completed too late to see service in the war, West Maximus spent the interwar years in commercial service.

After America's entry into World War II in December 1941, West Maximus participated in a number of wartime convoys. She was torpedoed and sunk by the  while sailing to the United States on 5 May 1943, a casualty of the convoy battle regarded as the turning point in the Battle of the Atlantic.

Construction and design

West Maximus was built in Seattle, Washington in 1918-19 at the No. 2 Plant of the Skinner & Eddy Corporation—the 20th in a series of 24 Design 1013 cargo ships built by the company for the United States Shipping Board's emergency wartime shipbuilding program. Initially intended for commission into the U.S. Navy as an auxiliary, West Maximus was assigned the navy identification code ID-3924, but the proposed commission was later withdrawn, probably because the war ended before the ship's completion. The ship was launched on 28 December 1918, about six weeks after the end of the war, and delivered to the USSB in April 1919.

West Maximus is listed in mercantile records as having a deadweight tonnage of 8,595 tons (8,800 nominal) and a gross register tonnage of 5,561 (5,600 nominal).  The ship had an overall length of 423 feet 9 inches, a beam of 54 feet and a draft of 24 feet 2 inches. She was powered by a  steam turbine driving a single screw propeller, delivering a service speed of 11 to 12 knots.

Service history

Entering service shortly after the end of World War I, West Maximus was put into commercial service by the USSB. In the early 1920s, West Maximus was engaged in service from both Europe and South America to the United States. Shipping records show that West Maximus arrived in New York from Stettin, Germany in June 1921, and completed another voyage from Montevideo, Uruguay in November. Newspaper records indicate that West Maximus made several voyages between Baltimore, Maryland and Manchester, England in late 1922. The following year, the vessel was again engaged in service between various ports in Europe and New York, arriving from Danzig via Southampton on 21 June, and from Helsingborg, Sweden on August 11.

After this, West Maximus became one of the hundreds of American ships laid up in U.S. ports because of the postwar oversupply of shipping. She remained laid up at New Orleans until mid-1940, when she became one of a batch of 10 ships reconditioned and placed back into service by the U.S. Maritime Commission to help alleviate a shortfall in tonnage caused by shipping losses in the early part of World War II. Following her recondition, West Maximus was transferred to management of the Moore-McMormack shipping line of Baltimore, and the vessel was still in service with that company when the United States entered the war in December 1941.

World War II

With America's entry into World War II in December 1941, West Maximus quickly became engaged in convoy duty. The ship participated in her first wartime convoy in mid-1942, when on 17 June she loaded a cargo of steel and general goods at Baltimore bound for Liverpool, England. From Boston the vessel proceeded in convoy to Halifax and Sydney, Nova Scotia, where on the 26th she departed in an escorted convoy for Liverpool, arriving at her destination 11 July. After unloading her cargo, the ship commenced the return to the U.S. on 19 July, but on 4 August the convoy in which she was sailing was dispersed and West Maximus proceeded alone to New York.

At New York, West Maximus loaded a cargo of general goods again bound for Liverpool, leaving for Halifax 19 August. On 22 August, West Maximus departed Halifax for Liverpool with a large escorted convoy, arriving at her destination 7 September. With her cargo unloaded, West Maximus joined an escorted convoy for the return to New York, departing 26 September and arriving safely on 17 October.

Rescue at sea

From New York, West Maximus departed in an unescorted convoy to South America, arriving at Guantanamo, Cuba 19 November and Trinidad on the 24th. From this point, she proceeded on December 5 to Rio de Janeiro, Brazil. During this voyage, the captain of West Maximus, Otto Heitman, observed what he first feared might be an enemy submarine, but soon realized the object of his attention was an empty lifeboat. On further investigation, two more lifeboats were spotted, containing 41 survivors from the torpedoed British ship MV Teesbank. After rescuing the survivors,  Heitmann proceeded to the port of Rio, arriving December 22. Here, as a token of gratitude and a memento for the rescue, he was presented with a silver cigarette case by British members of the Rio community.

Return to Atlantic service

Departing Rio December 31, West Maximus returned to Trinidad and thence to Guantanamo, where she sailed in an unescorted convoy on 29 January for New York, arriving 4 February. At New York, West Maximus loaded a general cargo again bound for Liverpool. Leaving in an escorted convoy on 14 March, the ship reached her destination on 3 April 1943.

Final voyage

After unloading her cargo at Liverpool, West Maximus prepared to return to the United States in what would turn out to be her final voyage. On 21 April the ship joined Convoy ONS-5 for her return to the United States. A few days into the voyage, the convoy ran into a Force 10 gale and its speed was reduced to only three knots, allowing a wolf pack of 27 U-boats to gather for interception. The wolf pack attacked on the night of 4–5 May, and one of the first ships struck was West Maximus, hit by a torpedo from  that blew off a large section of the ship's stern. The vessel remained afloat, but while her crew were waiting for rescue, U-264 fired two more torpedoes which struck the ship at 1.10 and 1.30 am respectively on 5 May, and West Maximus went down by the bows about ten minutes later. Six of the ship's complement of 62 were killed in the attack, including an officer, four crew members, and an armed guard.

In spite of its heavy losses therefore, Convoy ONS-5 is considered to be the turning point in the Battle of the Atlantic, as U-boats from this point were to suffer increasingly heavy losses for steadily diminishing results.

References

Bibliography

Infield, Glenn B. (1958): Disaster at Bari, Chapter 6, Bantam Books. (Reprinted in 1988 with ).
Jordan, Roger H. (2006): The World's Merchant Fleets, 1939: The Particulars And Wartime Fates of 6,000 Ships, Naval Institute Press, .
West Maximus , Dictionary of American Naval Fighting Ships.

1918 ships
Design 1013 ships
Ships built by Skinner & Eddy
Merchant ships of the United States
World War II shipwrecks in the Atlantic Ocean
Maritime incidents in May 1943
Ships sunk by German submarines in World War II